Abdul Bari Siddiqui is an Indian politician who was the Finance Minister of Bihar. He was a MLA representing Alinagar, Darbhanga, Bihar.  Siddiqui is a member of the Rashtriya Janata Dal political party. He won in the 2015 Bihar Legislative Assembly election. In 2019 Loksabha elections he contested from Darbhanga and lost to Gopal Jee Thakur of BJP by a margin of 2,67,979 votes.

Previously, Siddiqui was the Leader of Opposition following the 2010 Bihar Legislative Assembly election until the split between JD(U) and BJP led the latter to leave the government and become the official opposition.

Siddiqui was elected the chairman of the Bihar Cricket Association in September, 2015 defeating former association president Vinod Kumar. He is also the head of the Bihar Badminton Association. He is known to be a close associate of Lalu Prasad Yadav. When asked in 2009, to contest the Madhubani  Parliamentary Elections, he filed his nomination and unsuccessfully contested, losing by the margin of 10k votes, which led to trailingredients of Dr. Shakeel Ahmed to 3rd position. He again contested 2014 Madhubani  Loksabha elections unsuccessfully losing to veteran BJP leader Hukumdev Narayan Yadav by a margin of 15k votes. He is 7th time MLA. Previously he used to contest from Bahera. After delimination of that constituency, he contested from Alinagar.

Abdul Bari Siddiqui representing JP defeated Harinath Mishra of Congress in 1977 from Bahera, which was the first time he became an MLA. Siddiqui has won 7 times as a  Member of Bihar Legislative Assembly.

His son, Anis Bari is currently a MC/MPA 2023 candidate at Harvard Kennedy School, is an author and entrepreneur who runs an Ed-tech start-up based in Delhi. He

References

Living people
Indian Muslims
United Progressive Alliance candidates in the 2014 Indian general election
Leaders of the Opposition in the Bihar Legislative Assembly
Bihar MLAs 2015–2020
Rashtriya Janata Dal politicians
People from Darbhanga district
Finance Ministers of Bihar
1960 births
Janata Dal politicians
Janata Party politicians
Janata Party (Secular) politicians